Spit Point is a narrow gravel spit forming the south side of the entrance to Yankee Harbor, Greenwich Island, in the South Shetland Islands, situated at the end of Provadiya Hook. The point was known to early sealers in the area and roughly charted on Powell's map of 1822. It was recharted by DI personnel on the Discovery II in 1935 and given this descriptive name.

Maps
 L.L. Ivanov et al. Antarctica: Livingston Island and Greenwich Island, South Shetland Islands. Scale 1:100000 topographic map. Sofia: Antarctic Place-names Commission of Bulgaria, 2005.
 L.L. Ivanov. Antarctica: Livingston Island and Greenwich, Robert, Snow and Smith Islands. Scale 1:120000 topographic map.  Troyan: Manfred Wörner Foundation, 2009.

References
 SCAR Composite Gazetteer of Antarctica.

 

Headlands of Greenwich Island